Neglasari is a district of Tangerang City, Banten, Indonesia.

References

Tangerang
Districts of Banten